Chloe Daniels (born 27 April 2003) is a Canadian rugby sevens and rugby union player currently playing for Queen's University Women's Rugby Team in Ontario, Canada and the Canadian Women's rugby sevens team. Before playing for the university team, Daniels played for the Aurora Barbarians.

Daniels attended Sutton District High School, Ontario and Belmont Secondary School in Langford, British Columbia. Daniels was promoted to Canada's senior women's Sevens training program in 2020. Daniels was a part of the Queen's University Gaels team that won the 2021 Molinex Trophy against the University of Ottawa (26–18).

In 2022, Daniels represented Canada at the Sevens World Cup in Cape Town. They placed sixth overall after losing to Fiji in the fifth place final.

Statistics

References

2003 births
Living people
Canadian female rugby union players
Female rugby sevens players
21st-century Canadian women
Rugby sevens players at the 2022 Commonwealth Games